Charles Henzen (born October 4, 1945 in Switzerland) is a former Swiss ice hockey player who played for the Switzerland men's national ice hockey team at the 1972 and 1976 Olympics.

External links

Charles Henzen statistics at Sports-Reference.com

1945 births
Living people
Ice hockey players at the 1972 Winter Olympics
Ice hockey players at the 1976 Winter Olympics
Olympic ice hockey players of Switzerland
Swiss ice hockey defencemen